Peter Carvalho (born 18 December 1980) is an Indian football player who plays as a defensive midfielder.

Club career
In July 2015 Carvalho was drafted to play for Kerala Blasters FC in the 2015 Indian Super League.

International
On 10 July 2011 Carvalho played his first match for India against Maldives coming off the bench.

References

External links
 
 the-aiff.com
 
 
 goal.com

Footballers from Goa
1980 births
Living people
Indian footballers
I-League players
Dempo SC players
India international footballers
Kerala Blasters FC draft picks
Kerala Blasters FC players
Association football midfielders